The Sam Bailey Building, formerly the Sam Bailey Male Institute, is a historic school building in Griffin, Georgia. It was constructed in 1870 and is the oldest public school building in Griffin. Originally a private school, it became a public in August 1873 before becoming private again in 1877. Eight years later it became public again. It was built for the Griffin Male Institute and was named for Sam Wesley Bailey, a banker and landowner who came to Griffin after the American Civil War and helped fund the school. A two-story brick structure with Italianate details, it is part of the Griffin High School and is connected to other buildings via covered walkways. 

The school building was constructed by Jonathan Drake, a major building firm in Griffin. It is located at the corner of East Poplar Street and 4th Street. It was added to the National Register of Historic Places In 1973.

See also
National Register of Historic Places listings in Spalding County, Georgia

References

School buildings on the National Register of Historic Places in Georgia (U.S. state)
National Register of Historic Places in Spalding County, Georgia
School buildings completed in 1870
Educational institutions established in 1870
1870 establishments in Georgia (U.S. state)
Buildings and structures in Griffin, Georgia
Italianate architecture in Georgia (U.S. state)